John de Lisle Thompson OBE (12 July 1904 – 11 April 1978) was a cricketer who played first-class cricket for Rhodesia from 1928 to 1936, and a soldier.

Life and career
Jock Thompson was born in Cape Town but educated at Milton High School in Bulawayo, where he was head prefect in 1924 and captained the cricket and rugby teams.

In cricket Thompson was a wicket-keeper who often opened the batting. He was Rhodesia's wicket-keeper in 1931-32 when they finished second in the Currie Cup. He scored 28 and 47 that season in the one-wicket victory over Griqualand West. In his last first-class match he captained Rhodesia against the touring Australians in 1935-36. He also represented Rhodesia at rugby.

He was the author of A History of Sport in Southern Rhodesia, published in 1935. During World War II he served as an officer in West Africa, North Africa, and later in Europe, and after the war he became commanding officer of the 2nd Battalion of the Rhodesia Regiment. He was a director of the Thomas Meikle Trust and Investment Company.

He was awarded the OBE in the 1951 New Year Honours.

References

External links

Jock Thompson at CricketArchive

1904 births
1978 deaths
Cricketers from Cape Town
Rhodesia cricketers
Southern Rhodesian military personnel of World War II
Members of the Order of the British Empire